Gonzanamá is a canton in the Province of Loja, Ecuador. It is located in the south-east of the province, bordered by the cantons of Catamayo, Loja, Quilanga, Calvas, and Paltas.  It is the "agricultural, farming, and craftsmanship capital of Loja."  Gonzanamá covers 1272 km2 at an altitude of 2045 m, with a population of 17,276.  The principal town is Gonzanamá.

Demographics
Ethnic groups as of the Ecuadorian census of 2010:
Mestizo  96.7%
White  1.6%
Afro-Ecuadorian  1.2%
Montubio  0.3%
Indigenous  0.0%
Other  0.0%

Attractions
 Festivals of Buen Suceso Señor and Virgen de el Carmen - celebrated on August 20 and July 16, respectively.

Pagina Web(Blog): https://web.archive.org/web/20080409014717/http://gonzanama.ec.kz/

References

Cantons of Loja Province